is a Japanese manga series written and illustrated by Kou Yoneda. A sequel to Yoneda's previous one-shot stories Don't Stay Gold (2008) and Though They Drift, They Do Not Sink, But Nor Do They Sing (2009), it has been serialized in the boys' love (BL) manga magazine ihr HertZ, formerly known as HertZ, since August 2011. The manga was adapted into an anime film trilogy produced by Blue Lynx and animated by Grizzly beginning in 2020. It also inspired an original animation DVD (OAD) adaptation of Don't Stay Gold and an ongoing audio drama produced by Frontier Works.

Synopsis
The series follows Yashiro, a young, high-ranking yakuza boss and president of a front corporation. He is assigned a new bodyguard, Chikara Doumeki, who discovers that his employer is a hypersexual masochist. Yashiro develops an attraction to Doumeki, who rejects his advances. Yashiro later discovers that Doumeki is impotent and pursues a sadomasochistic relationship with him.

Characters
 

A high-ranking yakuza boss. While outwardly demanding but cheerful, he is secretly a sadomasochist who was sexually abused as a child by his step-father. He has difficulty in maintaining close personal relationships with others.

 

Yashiro's personal bodyguard. Formerly a police officer, he was forced to leave after going to prison. He became Yashiro’s bodyguard to earn more money. He is handsome and stoic, but suffers from sexual impotence.

 

Yashiro's friend since high school. A doctor, he runs his clinic as a legitimate business during the day but tends to Yashiro's wounded underlings at night. He has a sexual fetish for scars and scabs.

 

A 22-year-old former delinquent who grew up in a juvenile institution. His chest is covered in burn scars from his abusive childhood.

 

Yashiro's boss, mentor, and former lover.

 

The boss of the Matsubara yakuza.

 

The boss of the Shinseikai yakuza.

 

Yashiro's subordinate.

 

Yashiro's subordinate.

 

Misumi's personal secretary.

Media

Manga
Twittering Birds Never Fly has been serialized in the boys' love (BL) manga magazine ihr HertZ, formerly known as HertZ, since August 1, 2011. In Japan, the series has been collected into seven  volumes published by Taiyoh Tosho as of March 1, 2021. A limited edition of the series' fourth volume was packaged with a bonus manga booklet, revealing Doumeki's first encounter with Yashiro prior to becoming his underling.

In North America, an English-language translation of the first three volumes of the series was published by Juné, the BL imprint of Digital Manga, from 2014 to 2017. After a three year hiatus, the fourth volume was published digitally on December 4, 2020, and in print on January 12, 2021. The fifth and sixth volumes were published by Juné in late 2021. Twittering Birds Never Fly has also been translated into Chinese by Sharp Point Press, French by Taifu Comics, German by Manga Cult, Italian by Flashbook Edizioni, Korean by Ruvill, Polish by Wydawnictwo Kotori, and Spanish by Ediciones Tomodomo.

Audio drama
An audio drama adaptation of Twittering Birds Never Fly has been produced by Frontier Works since 2013, featuring Tarusuke Shingaki as the voice of Yashiro and Wataru Hatano as the voice of Doumeki.

Anime films
An anime film adaptation, Twittering Birds Never Fly – The Clouds Gather, was announced on April 26, 2019, and released on February 15, 2020. The film is animated by Grizzly and produced by Blue Lynx. The film's primary production staff includes Kaori Makita as director and Hiroshi Seko as scriptwriter; the film's score is composed by piano trio band H ZETTRIO. A sequel film, Twittering Birds Never Fly – The Storm Breaks, was announced on February 15, 2020. An as-of-yet untitled third Twittering Birds Never Fly film has also been announced.

The three films were licensed in English by Sentai Filmworks for theater bookings, virtual screenings, and home video releases in North America. The first film, The Clouds Gather, was released on Blu-ray on February 2, 2021.

Original anime DVD
An original anime DVD (OAD) adapting Don't Stay Gold was announced on February 15, 2020. It was packaged with a special edition of the seventh volume of the manga series on March 1, 2021. The OAD was licensed in English by Sentai Filmworks and began streaming on HIDIVE on September 10, 2021.

Reception
Over 1.5 million copies of Twittering Birds Never Fly are in print in Japan as of February 2020.

In 2014, Twittering Birds Never Fly was listed as a top recommended boys' love (BL) title in a national survey of Japanese bookstore employees. The manga was shortlisted for the Sugoi Japan Award 2016.

References

External links
  
  
  
 

2011 manga
2021 anime OVAs
BDSM literature
Digital Manga Publishing titles
Grizzly (studio)
Japanese radio dramas
Josei manga
LGBT in anime and manga
Sentai Filmworks
Yakuza in anime and manga
Yaoi anime and manga